Thomas Lloyd (1814 – 23 January 1890) was a British Liberal politician.

Lloyd was elected MP for Barnstaple at a by-election in October 1863, but was unseated in April 1864 due to bribery. Lloyd stood for election in 1868 at Bewdley but lost in an election which was also marred with bribery.

References

External links
 

UK MPs 1859–1865
1814 births
1890 deaths
Liberal Party (UK) MPs for English constituencies
Members of the Parliament of the United Kingdom for Barnstaple